Roberta Feldman is an architect and educator based in Chicago. She holds the title of Professor Emerita at the School of Architecture, University of Illinois Chicago. She has worked with Chicago housing and community organizations to revitalize and preserve low-income neighborhoods.

Career 
Feldman has spent her academic career at the School of Architecture at the University of Illinois at Chicago.  She was co-founder of the City Design Center at the University of Chicago in 1994, an interdisciplinary center that encompasses research, design, and community engagement.Her work with communities is based on a methodological approach of participatory design and action research. In her university, she served as Director of Architecture Graduate Studies and Associate Vice Chancellor for Academic Affairs.

Feldman has sustained working relationships with leaders in over fifty community organizations and development corporations in Chicago’s metro region’s low-income neighborhoods to address revitalizing and preserving these communities’ designed environments. Through the Center, Feldman initiated numerous advocacy projects as well as forums, summits, exhibits, and websites to raise the professions’ and public’s awareness of design’s potential to serve the public’s interest.

Feldman has received over 50 competitive grants from federal and local governments and foundations. One such grant was the 2011 Fellows of the American Institute of Architecture’s Latrobe Prize awarded to her and her colleagues Bryan Bell, Sergio Palleroni, and David Perkes to study public interest strategies in architecture in the U.S. and internationally.  Their report, Wisdom From the Field: Public Interest Architecture in Practice, describes the work of 100 public interest design and research practitioners and 50 of their community and governmental partners, in particular focusing on the ‘how to’ engage in this type of work.

Feldman’s research has focused on affordable and public housing design including author, with Susan Stall, of The Dignity of Resistance: Women Residents Activism in Chicago Public Housing, Cambridge University Press, 2004; editor of the pioneering Internet catalog, Design Matters: Best Practices in Affordable Housing; curator of the exhibit, “Out of the Box: Design Innovations in Manufactured Housing” which opened at the Field Museum in January 2005 and traveled through 2008; consultant to the Cabrini Green Local Advisory Council in the HOPE VI redevelopment of their community from 2002-2007;  editor with Jim Wheaton of The Chicago Greystone in Historic North Lawndale, distributed by University of Chicago Press, 2007, a guide to community revitalization though historic preservation; and a member of the collaborating team with Jeanne Gang for the “Foreclosed” exhibit at MOMA, New York.

She has served on the boards of the Graham Foundation for Advanced Studies in the Fine Arts, the Environmental Design Research Association, and the National Public Housing Museum.

Awards 
In addition to the awards she has won, Feldman also has an award named after her: the Roberta Feldman Architecture for Social Justice Award, which was established in 2020 and is awarded by AIA Chicago.

 Association for Community Design Award for Excellence, 2001
EDRA/Places Research Award, 2005
Association of Collegiate Schools of Architecture Collaborative Practice Award, 2007-2008
AIA Chapter Distinguished Service Award, 2008
ACSA Collaborative Practice Award, 2008
EDRA/Places/Metropolis Award for Research, 2008 
ACSA Service Award, 2011
Latrobe Prize with Sergio Palleroni, David Perkes, and Bryan Bell, 2011 
The Association of Collegiate Schools of Architecture Collaborative Practice Award with Charles Leek. 2011
Environmental Design Research Association Career Award, 2014
Women in Architecture award, 2016

Selected publications 
co-author of The Dignity of Resistance: Women Residents’ Activism in Public Housing with Susan Stall

 .

References

External links
Harvard University Graduate School of Design, http://execed.gsd.harvard.edu/people/roberta-feldman

Living people
American women architects
University of Illinois Chicago faculty
21st-century American architects
20th-century American architects
Smith College alumni
Columbia University alumni
City University of New York alumni
21st-century American women artists
Year of birth missing (living people)
20th-century American women